Stephan Konrad Matthai (or Matthäi) is a German geologist and petroleum engineer. He is currently Professor of Reservoir Engineering at University of Melbourne. Previously he had the same position at the University of Leoben.

Stephan was born and grew up in Nehren, a small village close to Tübingen, Germany. He received his M.Sc. in geology from University of Tübingen, then went on to receive his Ph.D. in geology from Australian National University. 
Later, he was a postdoctoral research fellow at Cornell and Stanford University. From 1996 to 2000 he was employed at the ETH Zurich. From 2001 to 2008 he was Governor's Lecturer at Imperial College London. 
During his time at Cornell he originated CSMP++, a finite element-finite volume software to solve partial differential equations involved with fluid flow in porous media and fractures.
Matthai is an expert on multiphase fluid flow in naturally fractured reservoirs, reservoir characterization and discrete fracture-matrix systems.

References

External links
http://www.petroleumengineer.at/pe-people.html
http://www3.imperial.ac.uk/people/s.matthai
http://www.ie.unimelb.edu.au/matthai/

20th-century German geologists
Petroleum engineers
Academics of Imperial College London
Australian National University alumni
University of Tübingen alumni
Cornell University fellows
Stanford University fellows
People from Tübingen (district)
Living people
Year of birth missing (living people)
Academic staff of the University of Leoben
20th-century German engineers
21st-century German engineers
21st-century German geologists
Engineers from Baden-Württemberg